Ernst Johan Andersson (born 8 December 1961 in Motala) is a Swedish politician and member of the Riksdag for the Swedish Social Democratic Party. He is currently taking up seat number 32 in the Riksdag for the constituency of Östergötland County.

Work in the Riksdag 
Andersson was elected into the Riksdag after the 2010 general election, he joined the Committee on the Labour Market the same year, he left the committee after the 2014 general election to become a member of the Committee on Transport and Communications, he served in the committee until the 2018 general election when he rejoined the Committee on the Labour Market. He is also a member of the election committee since September 2018. He has also been an alternate for several parliamentary committees notably the Committee on Transport and Communications, and the Committee on Education.

References 

1961 births
Living people
Members of the Riksdag from the Social Democrats
Members of the Riksdag 2010–2014
Members of the Riksdag 2014–2018
Members of the Riksdag 2018–2022
People from Motala Municipality

Members of the Riksdag 2022–2026